Teri Meri Kahaani or Teri Meri Kahani may refer to

 Teri Meri Kahaani (film), a 2012 Bollywood film
 Teri Meri Kahani (film), a 2021 Pakistani film
 Teri Meri Kahani (TV series), a Pakistani television series which was aired in 2018
 "Teri Meri Kahaani", a song from the 2015 film Gabbar Is Back
 "Teri Meri Kahani (song)", a song from the 2019 Bollywood film Happy Hardy and Heer

See also
 "Teri Meri", a song from the 2011 Hindi Bollywood film Bodyguard